The Ourapterygini are one of the large tribes of geometer moths in the subfamily Ennominae. The tribe was described by Charles Théophile Bruand d'Uzelle in 1846. They are particularly plentiful in the Neotropics. Ourapterygini are generally held to be the youngest tribe of their subfamily, and at least seasonally have characteristic apomorphic asymmetrical processes of the anellus.

Many members of this tribe are remarkably butterfly like. The tribe contains more partially diurnal species than usual for geometer moths, and many do not have the cryptic coloration typical for the family. There is a tendency to light yellowish hues and either little or a quite bold pattern, making some species rather conspicuous. It is known that at least some are noxious to predators, and such coloration might be aposematic.

Genera and selected species
As numerous Ennominae genera have not yet been assigned to a tribe, this genus list is preliminary.

Footnotes

References

 (2008). Family group names in Geometridae. Retrieved 22 July 2008.

  (2008). "Characterisation of the Australian Nacophorini using adult morphology, and phylogeny of the Geometridae based on morphological characters". Zootaxa. 1736: 1–141.